Gibraltar became a full member of UEFA, the governing body of association football in Europe, on 24 May 2013. Teams from the territory can qualify for UEFA's two main continental competitions, the UEFA Champions League and the UEFA Europa League, and have entered since the 2014–15 season.

Lincoln Red Imps have represented Gibraltar in four seasons of the Champions League, twice reaching the second qualifying round. In 2016, they won 1–0 at that stage against former European champions Celtic, but lost 3–1 on aggregate. The team Europa has represented the territory in the Europa League three times, their best performance being losing the second qualifying round to AIK of Sweden in 2016.

UEFA Champions League
Lincoln Red Imps, after winning the Gibraltar Premier Division for the 12th consecutive time, were the first team from the territory to enter a UEFA competition, the 2014–15 UEFA Champions League. They entered in the first qualifying round, where they were drawn against HB Tórshavn, champions of the Faroe Islands. On 2 July 2014, they hosted the first leg at the Victoria Stadium, and took the lead through a penalty kick by Joseph Chipolina, but Levi Hanssen equalised in a 1–1 draw.  Six days later in the second leg at Tórsvøllur, HB won 5–2 (6–3 aggregate).

In the 2015–16 UEFA Champions League, Lincoln again represented Gibraltar, and were drawn in the first qualifying round against FC Santa Coloma, the champions of Andorra. The first leg at home on 30 June 2015 was a goalless draw, then a week later they travelled to the second at the Estadi Comunal d'Andorra la Vella. Ildefons Lima put the hosts ahead before half time, but Lincoln responded with goals from Anthony Bardon and Lee Casciaro to win 2–1, becoming the first Gibraltarians to reach the second qualifying round. They lost there, 3–0 on aggregate to FC Midtjylland from Denmark.

Lincoln represented Gibraltar for a third consecutive time next season. In the first qualifying round, they were drawn against FC Flora from Estonia. In the first leg on 28 June at A Le Coq Arena in Tallinn, Chipolina scored an away goal in a 2–1 loss. Eight days later in the second leg, a Chipolina penalty and another goal by Antonio Calderón gave the team a 3–2 aggregate win. In the next round, Lincoln faced Celtic, champions of Scotland and 1967 European champions. They won the home leg 1–0 on 12 July, Casciaro scoring the only goal after 48 minutes, but lost 3–0 at Celtic Park eight days later.

Europa F.C. won the 2016–17 Gibraltar Premier Division to become the first team other than Lincoln Red Imps to play in the Champions League, and were drawn with Welsh champions The New Saints in the first qualifying round. They won the first leg 2–1 away but were eliminated after a 3–1 extra time loss at home in the second.

A new preliminary round was introduced in 2018–19 as a knockout tournament for the champions of Europe's four weakest leagues. Hosted at the Victoria Stadium, Lincoln defeated La Fiorita of San Marino but lost the final 4–1 after extra time to Drita of Kosovo.

Notes
 PR: Preliminary round
 1Q: First qualifying round
 2Q: Second qualifying round

UEFA Europa League
College Europa, runners-up to Lincoln in the 2014 Rock Cup, became the first Gibraltarian club to enter the UEFA Europa League, losing 4–0 on aggregate in the first qualifying round to FC Vaduz of Liechtenstein.

The following season, Europa again qualified, as league runners-up. In the first qualifying round, they faced Slovan Bratislava of Slovakia and lost 9–0 on aggregate, including 6–0 at home in the first leg, conceding a hat-trick by Karol Mészáros.

For a third consecutive season, Europa represented Gibraltar in the Europa League. Despite losing the second leg 2–1 away in Armenia, the team defeated Pyunik 3–2 on aggregate to advance for the first time. In the second qualifying round, they lost each leg by a single goal to Sweden's AIK.

In the 2017–18 UEFA Europa League, Gibraltar's entries were upgraded to two: league runners-up Lincoln Red Imps and third-placed European debutants St Joseph's. Both were drawn with Cypriot opposition in the first qualifying round and lost heavily on aggregate: 6–1 to AEK Larnaca and 10–0 to AEL Limassol respectively.

Europa and St. Joseph's both entered for Gibraltar in 2018–19. While the former was beaten comprehensively by Kosovo's Prishtina in the first qualifying round, the latter took the Faroe Islands' B36 Tórshavn to a penalty shootout, which they lost after a 2–2 aggregate draw. Lincoln Red Imps dropped from the Champions League to the second qualifying round, where they lost 3–2 on aggregate to Welsh champions The New Saints.

Notes
 PR: Preliminary round
 1Q: First qualifying round
 2Q: Second qualifying round
 3Q: Third qualifying round

UEFA Europa Conference League
With the introduction of UEFA's third-tier continental competition, the UEFA Europa Conference League, enabling a league champion to qualify for its group stage by winning only two of the four ties they would face in qualifying, Lincoln Red Imps F.C. thus became the first Gibraltarian club to qualify for the group stages of a European competition, during the UEFA Europa Conference League's debut season.

 

Notes
 PR: Preliminary round
 1Q: First qualifying round
 2Q: Second qualifying round
 3Q: Third qualifying round
 PO: Play-off round
 GS: Group stage

References

European football clubs in international competitions
Football in Gibraltar